Shakhan (or, Sakhan)  is a hill range in the Indian state of Tripura.

References

Landforms of Tripura
Hills of India